Afaq is a muslim name. e.g Afaq Mushtaq..
Notable people with the name include:

Afaq Ahmed (born 1962), Pakistani politician
Afaq Hussain (1939–2002), Pakistani cricketer
Afaq Khoja (1626–1694), Uyghur political and religious leader
Afaq Raheem (born 1985), Pakistani cricketer